Jiří Pták (born 24 March 1946 in Děčín, Czechoslovakia), is a Czech rowing coxswain who competed for Czechoslovakia at six Olympic Games between 1968 and 1992 (except the 1984 Olympics, boycotted by the Eastern Bloc countries).

He was the first rower to compete at six Olympics. He was the third rower, after Briton Jack Beresford and Soviet Yuriy Lorentsson, to compete at five Olympics. (From 1896 to 2020, 26 rowers have competed at five Olympics and 8 at six Olympics.)

His best performance was fourth in the coxed eight at the 1980 Moscow Olympics, when his team lost out on bronze by 1.09 seconds.

See also
 List of athletes with the most appearances at Olympic Games

References

1946 births
Living people
Czech male rowers
Czechoslovak male rowers
Olympic rowers of Czechoslovakia
Rowers at the 1968 Summer Olympics
Rowers at the 1972 Summer Olympics
Rowers at the 1976 Summer Olympics
Rowers at the 1980 Summer Olympics
Rowers at the 1988 Summer Olympics
Rowers at the 1992 Summer Olympics
People from Děčín
Coxswains (rowing)
World Rowing Championships medalists for Czechoslovakia
European Rowing Championships medalists
Sportspeople from the Ústí nad Labem Region